Havana Maestros – AmeriCuba is a collaborative album by Havana Maestros, which fuses a cast of Cuban musicians including Barbarito Torres and Amadito Valdes of the Buena Vista Social Club, with tracks from American artists such as Missy Elliott, Janelle Monáe, Jason Derulo, Ben E. King, Fun., Otis Redding, Chic, Dionne Warwick, B.o.B. and others. With Major Lazer they recorded a bonus track, a Cuban version of the song "Lean On", which is only available as an online download. The album was produced by the Berman Brothers.

Track listing 
"Good Times" – Chic
"Whatcha Say" – Jason Derulo
"Stand By Me" – Ben E. King
"Get Ur Freak On" – Missy Elliott
"We Are Young" – Fun
"(Sittin' On) The Dock of the Bay" – Otis Redding
"Ritmo Cubano" – Havana Maestros
"I Say a Little Prayer" – Dionne Warwick
"Airplanes" – B.o.B and Hayley Williams
"Tightrope" – Janelle Monáe
"Fly" – Sugar Ray
"Ven" – Havana Maestros
"A Mi Manera" – Havana Maestros

Online bonus track
"Lean On" –  Major Lazer

References

Further reading
Billboard review of Havana Maestros – AmeriCuba
Billboard review of Havana Maestros feat. Major Lazor – Lean On

External links 
Official website
Havana Maestros on Facebook

Covers albums
Dance music albums by Cuban artists
Buena Vista Social Club
Salsa compilation albums
2017 compilation albums
Universal Music Group compilation albums
Son cubano compilation albums
Bolero compilation albums
Albums produced by the Berman Brothers (producers)
Spanish-language compilation albums
Mambo compilation albums
Compilation albums by Cuban artists